Rosa Elba Pérez Hernández (born 30 September 1968) is a Mexican politician affiliated with the PVEM. As of 2013 she served as Deputy of the LXII Legislature of the Mexican Congress representing Guanajuato.

References

1968 births
Living people
Politicians from Guanajuato
People from León, Guanajuato
Women members of the Chamber of Deputies (Mexico)
Ecologist Green Party of Mexico politicians
21st-century Mexican politicians
21st-century Mexican women politicians
Deputies of the LXII Legislature of Mexico
Members of the Chamber of Deputies (Mexico) for Guanajuato